Hassania Union Sport d'Agadir commonly referred to as Hassania Agadir and known as l'Hassania, or simply as HUSA, is a Moroccan football club based in Agadir. The club was founded on December 22, 1946. It plays its home games at Adrar Stadium.

History

Early years (1946–1963)
Hassania Union Sport d'Agadir was founded on 22 December 1946 by a group of patriots against French colonialism, and more particularly by Ahmed Kabbage, Abbas Kabbage, Hassan Oulhaj Akhannouch and Lahoucine Bijaouane, who are considered the founding fathers of the team. The founders chose a color for the team represented by two colors, red and white, and named it El Hassania, the name that expresses their adherence to their Moroccan identity.

Hassania Agadir appeared for the first time in its history at Ait Souss Stadium defying the French colonialism that refused to establish the club.

Since the establishment of the Hassania Club of Agadir in 1946, the founders of the club have appointed Hassan Oulhaj Akhannouch president of the club, and they have appointed Mr. Lahoucine Bijaouane as the general clerk of the club. The colonial French rejected the club's deposit file and kept standing in front of the establishment of the club. After the first match, Captain Chix summoned them to change the official shirt and to play outside Agadir, But the club refused and continued to train at the Marcala stadium, and they also played their match on it.

In 1956, Morocco gained independence, and the club was re-established, and it continued to struggle to qualify for the first division, and after two years of independence, the club succeeded in qualifying in the 1958/1959 season. At the end of February in 1960, the city of Agadir was hit by a strong earthquake, which claimed the lives of thousands, and among these victims were the Hassania Agadir players. After this disastrous ordeal passed, the team restructured itself again, and qualified in 1963 to the Throne Cup final.

The golden generation (2001-2008)
Hassania Agadir has not won any championship since its establishment until the 2001/2002 season, winning the Moroccan League title for the first time in its history. In the following season, he won the title for the second time in a row, after Raja drew in its last match, so that Soussi club won the title for the second time in a row.

In 2006, Hassania Agadir will return to the competition for titles by reaching the Throne Cup final, a final that the Soussi team lost to Olympique Khouribga 1–0. The quarter-final witnessed a great surprise with Raja's withdrawal from the competition and not attending the Al Inbiaat stadium in Agadir. 2008/07 season, Hassania will present a good season and will occupy the fourth place, which qualified it to participate in the Arab Champions League.

Back to the podium (2018-2020)
After years of poor results and absence from the competition for titles, HUSA will return to compete in the Moroccan League for the 2018/17 season and will occupy the first place for more than half of the season, and by the end of the season, she will fall to third place. The same thing was repeated in the 2019/18 season, Hassania Agadir ranked third after a great competition with Olympique Safi, who drew in the last match, and Hassania qualified to participate in the African Confederation Cup. As for the Throne Cup, Hassania Agadir reached the final of the competition and lost the cup to Ittihad Casablanca by 2–1.

Hassania was on a date with history in the 2020/19 season, it qualified for the semi-finals of the African Confederation Cup for the first time in its history, and was eliminated against the other Moroccan team RS Berkane, with a score of 1–2.

Honours 
Moroccan League First Division: 2
2002, 2003
Coupe du Trône: 0
Runner-up : 1963, 2006, 2019
Moroccan League Second Division: 1
1996

Home staduim

The stadium is home to Hassania Agadir, replacing their old venue Stade Al Inbiaâte. The stadium was inaugurated on October 11, 2013, with a friendly match between local side Hassania Agadir and Algerian club JS Kabylie.

Supporters
Hassania Agadir is encouraged by the two Ultras groups, the first is called "Imazighen" founded on 17 December 2006, and the second is the "Red Rebels" in July 2011.

Performance in CAF competitions
CAF Champions League: 2 appearances
2003 – Second Round
2004 – Second Round
CAF Confederation Cup: 3 appearances 
2007 – Second Round
2018–19 – Quarter Finals
2019–20 – Semi-Finals

Current squad

Managers
 Ion Oblemenco (1996)
 Marcel Pigulea (1996–1997)
 Mohamed Fakhir (2002–03)
 Aurel Țicleanu (2004)
 Eugen Moldovan (2005–06)
 Miguel Angel Gamondi (7 January 2007 – 14 November 2007)
 Azzedine Aït Djoudi (2007–08)
 Eugen Moldovan (2008–09)
 Jean-François Jodar (1 July 2009 – 11 June)
 Hubert Velud (5 July 2011 – 4 October 2011)
 Mustapha Madih (1 November 2011 – 7 April 2014)
 Abdelhadi Sektioui ( 23 June 2014 - 4 April 2017)
 Miguel Angel Gamondi (1 July 2017 – 19 November 2019)
 Mohamed Fakhir (20 November 2019 – 21 January 2020)
 Mustapha Ouchrif (22 January 2020 – 6 August 2021)
 Abdelhadi Sektioui (10 December 2021 – 28 July 2022)
 Marcos Paquetá (28 July 2022 – present)

References

External links

 
Football clubs in Morocco
Association football clubs established in 1946
1946 establishments in Morocco
Sports clubs in Morocco
Agadir
20th-century architecture in Morocco